Liladhar Kotoki (born 1 December 1917) was an Indian politician. He was elected to the Lok Sabha, lower house of the Parliament of India from Nowgong, Assam in 1957, 1962, 1967, and 1971 as a member of the Indian National Congress.

References

External links
 Official biographical sketch in Parliament of India website

1917 births
Possibly living people
India MPs 1957–1962
India MPs 1962–1967
India MPs 1967–1970
India MPs 1971–1977
Assam politicians
Lok Sabha members from Assam
People from Nagaon district
Indian National Congress politicians from Assam